Arthur Nobile (May 6, 1920 in Newark, New Jersey – January 13, 2004) was an American microbiologist.  He is best known for his isolation and reproduction of the steroids prednisone and prednisolone.

Education 
Nobile studied at the University of Southern California before he earned his B.S. degree from the University of California, Berkeley

Career 
Nobile's work with the steroid drugs prednisone and prednisolone is widely considered one of the largest advances in 20th century medicine.

References 

1920 births
2004 deaths
University of California, Berkeley alumni
University of Southern California alumni
American biologists
20th-century biologists